Knockmore is a village in County Mayo, Ireland in the Parish of Backs. It is adjacent to Lough Conn between the towns of Castlebar and Ballina.

Sport
The local Gaelic football, Knockmore GAA, has won 9 Mayo Senior Football Championships, three Connacht Senior Club Football Championships, and in 1997 they reached the All-Ireland Senior Club Football Championship final, losing out to Crossmaglen Rangers.

See also
 List of towns and villages in Ireland.

References

Towns and villages in County Mayo